Belize first participated at the Olympic Games in 1968 and has sent athletes to compete in every Summer Olympic Games since then, except when they participated in the American-led boycott of the 1980 Summer Olympics.  The nation has never participated in the Winter Olympic Games.  From 1968 to 1972, Belize was known by its colonial name of British Honduras.

As of 2018, no athlete from Belize has ever won an Olympic medal.

The National Olympic Committee for Belize was created in 1967 and recognized by the International Olympic Committee that same year.

Medal tables

Medals by Summer Games

See also
 List of flag bearers for Belize at the Olympics
 :Category:Olympic competitors for Belize

External links